The Foreigners Registration Office (FRO) is an Indian government agency responsible for administering foreigner registration and immigration related functions for visitors to India.

Foreigner registration in India
Foreigner registration is a mandatory requirement by the Government of India under which all foreign nationals (excluding overseas citizens of India) visiting India on a long term visa (more than 180 days) are required to register themselves with a Registration Officer within 14 days of arriving in India. Pakistani nationals visiting India are required to register within 24 hours of arrival regardless of the duration of their stay. Foreign children below the age of 16 are exempt from registration requirements.

Regional officers

Foreigners Regional Registration Offices (FRRO)
Foreigners Regional Registration Offices (FRRO) are established in various regions for ease of registration. Offices are located in Kolkata, Mumbai, New Delhi, Chennai, Amritsar, Bangalore and Hyderabad. In regions without offices, the District Superintendents of Police serve as Registration Officers.

eFRRO
In April 2018, the Union Government launched the e-FRRO scheme which allows foreigners to register and avail visa and immigration related services online. Under the new scheme, a foreign citizen is no longer required to appear in-person at an FRRO, unless specifically required to do so. Around 360,000 foreign citizens visited FRRO offices across India in 2017.

References

Immigrant services organizations
Immigration to India
Immigration services